Leblond or Le Blond is a surname, and may refer to:

People 

Elizabeth Hawkins-Whitshed, known as Lizzie LeBlond after marriage, Irish mountaineer 
Auguste-Savinien Leblond, a French mathematician who coined the term metre
Charles Hubert Le Blond, an American Catholic bishop
Charles Philippe Leblond, a Canadian biologist
Francis Celeste Le Blond, an American politician
Guillame Le Blond, a French mathematician, great uncle of Auguste-Savinien (see above)
Jacob Christoph Le Blon, a Frankfurt painter and engraver
Jean Leblond, a Belgian long-distance runner
Jean-Baptiste Leblond, a French materials scientist
Jean-Baptiste Alexandre Le Blond, a French architect
Jean-Marc Lévy-Leblond, a French physicist
Louis Vincent Le Blond de Saint-Hilaire, a French general
Marius-Ary Leblond, the pseudonym of a pair of French literary cousins
Michel Leblond, a French football player
Pierre-Luc Létourneau-Leblond, a Canadian hockey player
Richard le Blond, an Irish lawyer of the 14th century

Other 

 Cape Leblond, a peninsula in Antarctica
 R. K. LeBlond Machine Tool Company, American industrial firm
 LeBlond Aircraft Engine Corporation, subsidiary of above
 LeBlond radial engines, family of aircraft engines designed by above